Vateria copallifera is a species of plant in the family Dipterocarpaceae. It is endemic to Sri Lanka. Fruits have a bitter taste. Traditionally people in the surrounding villages of the tree growing areas collect fruits for preparation of various food items including one of famous food called 'Hal Guti'.

Culture
Known as හල් (hal) in Sinhala.

References

Flora of Sri Lanka
copallifera
Endangered plants
Taxonomy articles created by Polbot